Pierre René Marie Fernand Médéric François Frotier de La Coste-Messelière (3 March 1894, Saint-Génard (Deux-Sèvres) – 4 January 1975, idem) was a 20th-century French archaeologist and specialist of archaic Greek art.

He was elected a member of the Académie des inscriptions et belles-lettres in 1944 and also was a member of the French School of Athens.

References

External links 
 Pierre de La Coste-Messelière on data.bnf.fr
 Pierre de La Coste-Messelière's Bibliography
 La Coste-Messelière, Pierre de (1894-1975) 

1894 births
People from Deux-Sèvres
1975 deaths
French archaeologists
Members of the Académie des Inscriptions et Belles-Lettres
Members of the French School at Athens
20th-century archaeologists